Gymnoscelis taprobanica is a moth in the family Geometridae. It was described by Louis Beethoven Prout in 1958. It is endemic to Sri Lanka.

References

Moths described in 1958
taprobanica